Prism Rail was formed in July 1995 to bid for rail franchises in the United Kingdom during the privatisation of British Rail. It expressed interest in eighteen franchises, was shortlisted for twelve and was ultimately awarded four, LTS Rail, Valley Lines, Wales & West, and West Anglia Great Northern.

Prism Rail was founded by a number of individuals from the bus industry. The company raised the money to acquire its first passenger rail franchise from a small number of institutional investors, following which the shares were listed on the Alternative Investment Market in May 1996.

In July 2000 Prism Rail was purchased by National Express. The merger of the companies was completed on 19 September 2000.

In the following four years LTS rebranded as c2c, Valley Lines and Wales & West merged into Wales and Borders, and WAGN was split.

References

British companies established in 1995
Defunct companies of the United Kingdom
Post-privatisation British railway companies
Railway companies established in 1995
Railway companies disestablished in 2000
Railway operators in London
2000 disestablishments in the United Kingdom